In enzymology, a phosphoglucomutase (glucose-cofactor) is an enzyme that catalyzes the chemical reaction

alpha-D-glucose 1-phosphate  D-glucose 6-phosphate

Hence, this enzyme has one substrate, alpha-D-glucose 1-phosphate, and one product, D-glucose 6-phosphate.

This enzyme belongs to the family of isomerases, specifically the phosphotransferases (phosphomutases), which transfer phosphate groups within a molecule.  The systematic name of this enzyme class is alpha-D-glucose 1,6-phosphomutase (glucose-cofactor). Other names in common use include glucose phosphomutase, and glucose-1-phosphate phosphotransferase.  This enzyme has at least one effector, D-Glucose.

References

 
 Boyer, P.D. (Ed.), The Enzymes, 3rd ed., vol. 6, 1972, p. 407-477.

EC 5.4.2
Enzymes of unknown structure